Édouard Castres (21 June 1838 in Geneva – 28 June 1902 in Annemasse) was a Swiss painter.

Castres studied fine arts with Barthélemy Menn in Geneva before enrolling in the École des Beaux-Arts in Paris. He took part in the Franco-Prussian War of 1870/71 as a Red Cross volunteer accompanying General Bourbaki's Eastern Army throughout the last phase of the war.  With collaborators he executed, in 1881, a large-scale panorama showing the withdrawal of Bourbaki's army into Switzerland and its internment.  This Panorama is displayed in a rotunda in Lucerne.

External links

Bourbaki Panorama Luzern at www.bourbakipanorama.ch

19th-century Swiss painters
Swiss male painters
1838 births
1902 deaths
Artists from Geneva
19th-century Swiss male artists